Christopher Cornelius Byrd (born August 15, 1970) is an American former professional boxer who competed from 1993 to 2009. He is a two-time world heavyweight champion, having first won the WBO title in 2000 after an upset corner stoppage over then-undefeated Vitali Klitschko. In his first title defense later that year, he lost to Vitali's brother Wladimir Klitschko. In 2002, Byrd defeated Evander Holyfield to win the IBF heavyweight title for his second reign as world champion. He made four successful defenses until losing his title again to Wladimir Klitschko in a 2006 rematch. He was ranked by BoxRec as the world's top 10 heavyweight from 1996 to 2003, reaching his highest ranking of No.4 in 1998.

As an amateur, Byrd represented the United States at the 1992 Summer Olympics and won a silver medal in the middleweight division. He is also a three-time national amateur champion, winning the light middleweight title in 1989, and the middleweight title in 1991 and 1992.

Early life
Chris Byrd was the youngest of eight children growing up in Flint, Michigan. He began boxing at age 5, training in his father (Joe Sr.)'s Joe Byrd Boxing Academy.  His father continued to train and manage Byrd as a professional.  Byrd attended Flint Northwestern High School.

Amateur career
Byrd began competing in the ring at age 10, since then he had 285 amateur fights in various weight classes, compiled an impressive record of 275 wins, 10 losses. He was a three-time U.S. amateur champion (1989, 1991, and 1992). He was on the 1991 U.S. National boxing Team that became the first (and only) U.S. team to score a tie against the heralded Cuban team.
Byrd won the silver medal in the 1992 Barcelona summer Olympics as a middleweight, losing to Cuba's Ariel Hernández in the final.

Amateur highlights
Lost in the 1988 Olympic Trials at Light Welterweight, losing to eventual United States representative Todd Foster.
1989 United States Amateur Light Middleweight Champion
1990 Goodwill Games in Seattle, lost to Torsten Schmitz (East Germany) on points, in Light Middleweight competition.
1991 United States Amateur Middleweight Champion
1991 World Championships, lost at Middlweight to Ramon Garbey (Cuba)
1992 United States Amateur Middleweight Champion
1992 Middleweight Gold Medalist at Canada Cup. Results were:
Justin Crawford (Australia) won on points
Joe Laryea (Ghana) won on points
Igor Anashkin (Russia) won on points
1992 Qualified as a Middleweight at the Olympic Trials in Worcester, MA. Results were:
Derrick James won on points
William Joppy won on points
Mike DeMoss won on points
Eric Carr won on points, this bout was at the Olympic Box-Offs in Phoenix, AZ*
Captured the Middleweight Silver Medal at the 1992 Barcelona Olympic Games. Results were:
Mark Edwards (Great Britain) 21-3
Alexander Lebziak (Russia/Unified Team) 16-7
Ahmed Dine (Algeria) 21-2
Chris Johnson (Canada) 17-3
Ariel Hernandez (Cuba) 7-12

Professional career

1993–1998: early career

Byrd turned professional on January 28, 1993, knocking out 10 of his first 13 opponents. Byrd moved up to heavyweight three fights into his professional career.

Byrd remained undefeated for his first 26 fights, knocking off then-notable opponents like Phil Jackson, Lionel Butler, Uriah Grant, Bert Cooper, Craig Peterson, Frankie Swindell, Jimmy Thunder, undefeated Eliecer Castillo and Ross Puritty.

1999: Byrd vs. Ibeabuchi, comeback victories
However, in 1999, Byrd's undefeated record came to a dead end when he fought undefeated Ike Ibeabuchi. With 48 seconds left in the fifth round, a left-handed bolo punch followed with a right hook sent Byrd to the canvas, face first.

2000: first world title, facing the Klitschkos

During the last week of March 2000, Byrd was offered the chance to be the replacement (for Donovan Ruddock) against undefeated champion Vitali Klitschko in Berlin, Germany (Klitschko's adopted home country) for the WBO Heavyweight Title. He therefore had only seven days to prepare for the fight (not the customary 6–12 weeks). Byrd struggled greatly in the fight, trailing after nine rounds by scores of 88–83 (on two cards) and 89–82 (on one card), i.e. losing seven or eight of those rounds. However, Klitschko severely injured his shoulder and was unable to continue after the ninth round. The injury that Klitschko suffered was a torn shoulder rotator cuff, which required major surgery and a 7-month lay-off. Despite trailing on all three of the judges' scorecards, Byrd walked away the winner by a technical knockout due to the injury to Klitschko.

Six months later, Byrd was back in Germany to defend the title against Wladimir Klitschko, Vitali's younger, more agile brother. Twelve rounds later, Byrd had lost a lopsided unanimous decision and the WBO belt after being knocked down twice.

2001–2002: comeback victories, second world title

Byrd returned to the U.S., signed with Don King and beat Maurice Harris to win the United States Boxing Association heavyweight belt in Madison Square Garden. He was now a top-five contender for the IBF title. After winning his next match (a title defense against New Zealand's top contender David Tua) Byrd eventually received his mandatory shot at the vacant IBF world Heavyweight Championship against Evander Holyfield in Atlantic City. On December 14, 2002, Byrd won a unanimous decision and the IBF title.

2003–2005: four successful title defenses
Byrd has successfully defended the IBF belt against: Fres Oquendo in 2003, a highly entertaining draw with Andrew Golota and a decision win over friend Jameel McCline in 2004, and DaVarryl Williamson in 2005. Byrd's fight with Golota did 75,000 buys on pay-per-view.

2006: Klitschko rematch

On April 22, 2006, Byrd faced Wladimir Klitschko for the second time. Byrd was making his fifth defense of his IBF title and the fight was also sanctioned by the  International Boxing Organization for its title, which had been vacated upon the retirement of Lennox Lewis. The fight took place at SAP Arena in Mannheim, Germany. Byrd was heavily dominated throughout the fight, was down in the fifth, and again in the seventh. Referee Wayne Kelly stopped the fight after the second knockdown when Byrd had an open cut near his eyes. Klitschko won in a TKO

2007–2010: Povetkin bout, move to light heavyweight, and retirement
After losing to Alexander Povetkin, Byrd would drop about 40 pounds to return to the light heavyweight division. He fought Shaun George on May 16, 2008, at the Thomas and Mack Center in Las Vegas. Byrd was dropped by George in round one and rocked again in round two. George then hammered Byrd with his right hand at will, finally flooring Byrd twice in the ninth round. Byrd beat the count after the first knockdown, but was then battered down again and the bout was waved off by the referee.

In 2010, Byrd officially announced his retirement from boxing.

Life outside boxing
Byrd hosts a weekly video podcast, entitled "Byrd's Eye View", which showcases former boxers as well as current professional and champion-level fighters.

Additional information
Byrd's hometown is Flint, Michigan, where he trained along with his brother Patrick Byrd and sister Tracy Byrd. Byrd's other sister, Laurie Byrd, is a professional basketball coach. Byrd is also a first cousin of Lamon Brewster, himself a former world heavyweight champion and two-time Klitschko opponent.
Byrd's corner consisted entirely of family members
Byrd made an appearance in the 2008 documentary Beyond the Ropes.
Byrd also makes an appearance in the 2011 documentary Klitschko, in which he discusses his trio of title bouts with the brothers.

Professional boxing record

Television viewership

Germany

US pay-per-view bouts

See also
List of heavyweight boxing champions
List of IBF world champions
List of WBO world champions
List of southpaw stance boxers

References

External links

1970 births
Living people
African-American boxers
Southpaw boxers
Boxers at the 1992 Summer Olympics
International Boxing Federation champions
Olympic boxers of the United States
Sportspeople from Flint, Michigan
Winners of the United States Championship for amateur boxers
World Boxing Organization champions
American male boxers
World heavyweight boxing champions
Medalists at the 1992 Summer Olympics
Olympic silver medalists for the United States in boxing
Light-middleweight boxers
Middleweight boxers
Boxers from Michigan
Competitors at the 1990 Goodwill Games